Lin Ruei-ming (born 2 October 1981) is a Taiwanese bobsledder. He competed in the four man event at the 2002 Winter Olympics.

References

1981 births
Living people
Taiwanese male bobsledders
Olympic bobsledders of Taiwan
Bobsledders at the 2002 Winter Olympics
Place of birth missing (living people)
21st-century Taiwanese people